Rodriques "Rod" Wilson (born November 12, 1981) is a former American football linebacker and coach who is a defensive assistant for the Kansas City Chiefs. He was drafted by the Chicago Bears in the seventh round of the 2005 NFL Draft. He played college football at South Carolina. He also played for the Tampa Bay Buccaneers and briefly for the Jacksonville Jaguars. He has also coached at Charleston Southern University.

Professional career

Chicago Bears
Wilson broke his arm in a 2008 preseason game against the San Francisco 49ers and was placed on injured reserve, ending his season. He was later released with an injury settlement.

Tampa Bay Buccaneers
Wilson signed with the Tampa Bay Buccaneers on December 17, 2008.

Jacksonville Jaguars
Wilson signed with the Jacksonville Jaguars on August 17, 2010. Following the NFL Preseason, he was released on September 3, 2010.

Chicago Bears
Wilson signed with the Chicago Bears on September 15, 2010 after an injury to linebacker Hunter Hillenmeyer.

Coaching career

Charleston Southern
Wilson was the inside linebackers coach at Charleston Southern University from 2013 to 2016.

Furman
On January 18, 2017, Wilson was hired as the linebackers coach at Furman University.

Kansas City Chiefs
On February 7, 2017, Wilson was hired as an assistant special teams coach by the Kansas City Chiefs after being a coach at Furman for only 20 days. In 2019, Wilson won his first Super Bowl when the Chiefs defeated the San Francisco 49ers 31-20 in Super Bowl LIV.

South Carolina
On February 21, 2020, Wilson was hired as the linebackers coach for the South Carolina Gamecocks.

Following the conclusion of the 2020 season, it was announced that Wilson would not be retained as a member of new head coach Shane Beamer's staff.

Coastal Carolina
On June 2, 2021, Wilson was hired as the inside linebackers coach for the Coastal Carolina Chanticleers.

Kansas City Chiefs
In March 2022, Wilson was re-hired by the Kansas City Chiefs as a defensive assistant.

References

1981 births
Living people
American football linebackers
Chicago Bears players
Jacksonville Jaguars players
Kansas City Chiefs coaches
People from Berkeley County, South Carolina
Players of American football from South Carolina
South Carolina Gamecocks football players
South Carolina Gamecocks football coaches
Tampa Bay Buccaneers players
Charleston Southern Buccaneers football coaches
Coastal Carolina Chanticleers football coaches